The Sister is Marissa Nadler's sixth studio album. It was released on May 29, 2012, by Box of Cedar Records. Nadler announced the album on her Facebook page as a "sister album" to her 2011 eponymous album. The album was dubbed by Paste Magazine an "impressive concoction of stark minimalism."

Track listing
 "The Wrecking Ball Company"
 "Love Again, There Is a Fire"
 "Christine"
 "Apostle"
 "Constantine"
 "To a Road, Love"
 "In a Little Town"
 "Your Heart Is a Twisted Vine"

References

External links
Marissa Nadler Official Site

2012 albums
Marissa Nadler albums